Suburgatory is an American television sitcom created by Emily Kapnek that aired on ABC from September 28, 2011, to May 14, 2014. The series originally aired on Wednesday nights at 8:30/7:30 Central following The Middle. The title is a portmanteau, devised by former CNN Senior Producer Linda Keenan, of the words "suburban" and "purgatory". On May 9, 2014, Suburgatory was canceled by ABC after three seasons.

Premise
The series follows George Altman, a single father who decides to get away from New York City to the suburbs so he can give his teenage daughter, Tessa, a better life. However, their move to the suburbs has his daughter wondering if they just entered the world of The Stepford Wives after they see how eerily perfect their new locale is, right down to the neighbors who welcome them into their cul-de-sac.

Episodes

Cast

Main cast
 Jeremy Sisto as George Altman, a single father and architect from New York City, who decides to move upstate to the suburbs wanting a better life for his daughter, Tessa. Many of the women in Chatswin become attracted to him, which even he is uncomfortable with. He remembers living in the city fondly, but realizes that he has become accustomed to Chatswin in season 3. He maintains a close friendship with Dallas, with whom he had a romantic relationship during season 2. 
 Jane Levy as Tessa Altman, George's daughter, who is less than thrilled about her new suburban surroundings. She maintains a romanticized idea of living in the city. She tries to maintain an emotional distance from the Chatswin residents, including her best friend Lisa and season 2 boyfriend Ryan. Because of this, she plots to subtly dump Ryan in season 2, but he ends the relationship first. In season 3, it is very clear that she is in love with Ryan and is not over their breakup.
 Carly Chaikin as Dalia Oprah Royce, a materialistic and fashion-driven valley girl in the popular group at school who becomes Tessa's rival. She is known to have a dry sense of humor and rarely expresses emotion, including never smiling. In season 2, it is revealed that she is obsessed with becoming George's daughter, referring to him as "Daddy Altman".
 Allie Grant as Lisa Marie Shay LeFrique, Tessa's best friend. She is rather awkward and often very embarrassed by her family. She is also very sensitive to any suggestions of rejection from her family or Tessa. Towards the end of season three, she marries Malik.
 Cheryl Hines as Dallas Royce, Dalia's mother and George's neighbor and later girlfriend. She employs Tessa and is a mother figure to her when she needs advice. She is married to Dalia's father in season one, but they divorce during the season. She dates George throughout season 2, but they break up when she realizes that she is not ready to live together. It is quite clear in season 3 that she and George are still interested in each other.
 Ana Gasteyer as Sheila Shay (mid-seasons 1–3; recurring previously), George and Tessa's nosy neighbor who lives directly across the street. She is Fred's domineering wife and Lisa's highly controlling mother. She is also the adoptive mother of both Ryan and Victor, upon whom she obsessively dotes, especially Ryan.
 Chris Parnell as Fred Shay (recurring, season 1; starring, seasons 2–3), Sheila's husband and Lisa's father. He is also the adoptive father to Ryan and Victor. He is often depicted as being henpecked and sheltered, but he tends to adapt well to new situations.
 Alan Tudyk as Noah Werner (starring, seasons 1–2; recurring, season 3), George's best friend, who is a dentist. He often helps George assimilate into suburban culture, having moved out of the city some years earlier. He is married to Jill, but is divorced when it is revealed that he is infatuated with their maid Carmen. In season 3, he pressures George and Fred to live the bachelor lifestyle with him. He also has a young daughter with Jill.
 Rex Lee as Mr. Wolfe (seasons 1–2), the school guidance counselor, who is always in a good mood. He is openly gay, after being inspired by Tessa to come out.
 Bryson Barretto as Victor Ha Shay (season 3), a little boy whom the Shays adopt to replace Ryan after he leaves for college. He is especially polite and always eager to please others, especially his foster family.

Recurring cast
 Maestro Harrell as Malik LeFrique, he became good friends with Tessa while working with her on the school newspaper. He has had an on-and-off relationship with Lisa. Towards the end of season 3, Malik and Lisa get married.
 Parker Young as Ryan Shay, the dim-witted football jock and Lisa's often embarrassing older brother. He is the most popular person at school, and appears to be as superficial as most other Chatswin residents. In the season 1 finale, Lisa discovers that Ryan is adopted, adding to her perception their parents favor Ryan over her. He dates Tessa through season 2, and allows her to help change his personality. However, he breaks up with her when Dalia admits that Tessa was planning to break up with him. He moves to college in Florida in season 3, and starts dating a girl similar in personality to Tessa.
 Bunnie Rivera as Carmen, Dallas' housekeeper, who is later hired by Noah. Noah later falls in love with her.
 Sam Lerner as Evan, a nerdy classmate who had a crush on Dalia.
 Todd Sherry as Tom, father of the twins Kaitlin and Kenzie.
 Gillian Vigman as Jill Werner, Noah's emotionally cold wife, who divorces him in season 2. She believes herself to be a successful self-employed writer, despite only releasing one self-published book. (seasons 1–2)
 Abbie Cobb as Kimantha, one of Dalia's friends. (seasons 1–2)
 Kara Pacitto and Katelyn Pacitto as Kenzie and Kaitlin, Dalia's friends, who are also twin sisters. When they are together with Kimantha, Tessa has referred to the three as "The KKK". Not only is this a reference to their shared first name initial, but to their common response "'kay". (seasons 1–2)
 Malin Åkerman as Alex, George's ex-wife, Tessa's mother in season 2. Tessa talks about her fondly in seasons 1 & 2, and goes to live with her. At the beginning of season 3, she has walked out on Tessa, for the second time.
 Miriam Flynn as Helen, Alex's mother, Tessa's Grandmother (seasons 1–2)
 Geoff Pierson as Emmett Altman. George's father, Tessa's grandfather. (season 3)
 Arden Myrin as Jocelyn, an employee at the local country club who is attracted to George. (season 1)
 Jay Mohr as Steven Royce, Dalia's father and Dallas' ex-husband. (seasons 1–2)
 Alicia Silverstone as Eden, George's ex-girlfriend and the surrogate mother of Noah and Jill's child, Opus. At the end of season one, she and George were together, but in the season two premiere it was mentioned that she and George had split up. (season 1)
 Thomas McDonell as Scott Strauss, a college-aged crush of Dalia's who becomes Tessa's love interest for a story arc. (seasons 1–2)
 Evan Arnold as Chef Alan, Mr. Wolfe's boyfriend who works as the chef in the high school cafeteria. He later cheats on Mr Wolfe, with his ex-boyfriend. (seasons 1–2)
 Alex Boling as Alex, Tom's best friend (seasons 1–2)
 Natasha Leggero as Nora, the owner of a pet shop and George's (potential) girlfriend. (season 3)
 Lindsey Shaw as June, Ryan's girlfriend who Tessa feels is a lot like her. (season 3)
 Ely Henry as Reggie, a nerdy student at Chatswin High. (seasons 2–3)

Development and production
The series first appeared on ABC's development slate in October 2010. On January 14, 2011, ABC placed a pilot order, written by Emily Kapnek and directed by Michael Fresco, who also served as executive producers. The half-hour comedy was produced by Warner Bros. Television.

Casting announcements began in February 2011, with Jane Levy the first actor cast, playing the role of Tessa Altman, a Manhattan teen who has been raised for the last fifteen years by a single father, George. Tessa dreads the idea of living in the suburbs. Next to join the series was Alan Tudyk in the role of Noah Werner, George's college buddy and a dentist who moved to the suburbs some years earlier. Allie Grant then joined the series as Lisa Shay, a socially awkward girl at school who befriends Tessa. Jeremy Sisto and Carly Chaikin followed with Sisto playing George Altman, Tessa's architect father who moves her from Manhattan to the suburbs, and Chaikin playing Dalia Royce, Tessa's neighbor who quickly becomes her nemesis at school. Cheryl Hines was next cast in the role of Dallas Royce, a well-to-do housewife and the mother of Dalia. She tells George that her absentee husband (Jay Mohr) "travels a lot". Rex Lee was the last actor cast, playing Mr. Wolfe, Tessa's clueless high school guidance counselor. He was originally a guest star but was upped to a series regular after the pilot.
Saturday Night Live (SNL) alumna Ana Gasteyer plays the Altmans' domineering neighbor, Sheila Shay, whom they vainly try to avoid. Fellow SNL alum Chris Parnell plays Fred, her husband, who toes the line. The Shays have two children: Lisa, who is Tessa's closest thing to a friend, and Ryan (Parker Young).

On May 13, 2011, ABC ordered the pilot to series, to air in the fall of the 2011–12 United States network television schedule. Suburgatory premiered on September 28, 2011, and aired on Wednesday nights at 8:30/7:30 central following The Middle. After initially ordering 11 episodes, ABC picked up Suburgatory for a full season on October 13, 2011. On December 16, 2011, it was announced that Alicia Silverstone would have a recurring role as Eden, a potential love interest for single father George. This marked the third time Silverstone and Jeremy Sisto had worked together, since first working on the 1995 American comedy film Clueless, and the 1995 thriller Hideaway.

On March 23, 2012, ABC announced that the series was renewed for the 2012–2013 television season. It would air after Modern Family, on 9:30/8:30 central timeslot replacing the new series The Neighbors which was originally scheduled to air in that timeslot.

Theme song
The theme song, "Pleasant Nightmare", was written by Jared Faber and Emily Kapnek and is sung by Alih Jey. The theme song is slightly different in episode 22 (the last episode of season 1). In the season 2 premiere, Tessa performs a longer version of the song, which she says her mother wrote. George performs the song for Dalia as the season 2 finale ends.

Location and setting
The series takes place in the fictional town of Chatswin. The onscreen map animation displayed in the opening credits zooms in on the affluent New York City suburbs of southern Westchester County as the geographic location of "Chatswin". The Westchester County 914 area code is also referenced in the show. The use of the 10805 postal code of the New Rochelle community, as the Chatswin postal code of main character George Altman signifies it as being the fictional town's true location.

The series takes its title from Suburgatory: Twisted Tales from Darkest Suburbia, a book by former CNN Senior Producer Linda Keenan, based in part on her experiences after she moved from New York City to three affluent suburbs, the first of which was in Westchester County. The book, released on October 11, 2011, thirteen days after the show premiered, is described on the front cover as "The Title behind the ABC Sitcom".

Reception
Suburgatory attracted generally positive reviews. The first season holds an 83% "Certified Fresh" rating on Rotten Tomatoes, an average rating of 7.1/10, sampled from reviews from 35 critics. Its consensus reads: "Suburban satires are nothing new, but Suburgatory offers enough abrasive wit and left-field jokes to keep it fresh." Metacritic gives the first season an initial score of 71 out of 100, calculated from reviews from 25 critics, implying "generally favorable reviews". On Rotten Tomatoes, the second season holds a score of 92%, with an average score of 8.1/10, based on 12 reviews, the consensus reads "Suburgatory's second season continues to cleverly balance its cheesy clichés and suburban spoofs." On Rotten Tomatoes, the third season holds a score of 100%, with an average score of 7.2/10, based on eight reviews.

"Kapnek manages to make a show that is both satiric and emotionally engaging", said David Wiegand of the San Francisco Chronicle, "two varieties of comedy [that] don't always work well together." On the other end, Neil Genzlinger of The New York Times blasted the show. "[It] begins with a tenuous premise, uses it to leap to an inaccurate dichotomy and supports that with tired, unfunny stereotypes."

Carly Chaikin received overwhelming critical praise for her role as Dalia Royce. Critics consistently referred to her as the series breakout star and she was arguably one of the most popular characters in the show. For her performance, Chaikin was nominated for the Critics' Choice Television Award for Best Supporting Actress in a Comedy Series, a Teen Choice Award for Choice TV Villain and many other various nominations for her role in Suburgatory, but fell short of winning any of them.

Ratings
The debut episode did well, scoring a 3.3 among the 18–49 demos with 9.81 million viewers tuning in.

Awards and nominations
Suburgatory was nominated for a 2012 People's Choice Award for "Favorite New TV Comedy", but lost to 2 Broke Girls, another show from Warner Bros. Television.

International broadcasts
The series has been picked up in Canada by City, where it is simulcast with the ABC broadcasts. In Latin America the series premiered on October 31, 2011, on Warner Channel. The show premiered on January 3 in Sweden on Kanal 5. In the Republic of Ireland the show began broadcasting on RTÉ Two from March 21, 2012 airing Wednesdays at 19:00. In Spain, it premiered on Cosmopolitan TV on January 13, 2012. The series began airing on the Nine Network's GO! Channel in Australia from February 5, 2012, until it was taken off air in 2012–2013 after poor ratings losing to 7TWO, The Comedy Channel from Foxtel now airs the sitcom. It premiered in Serbia on Serbian HBO Comedy on February 27, 2012, the Serbian name of the show is Čistilište u predgrađu. It also premiered in Poland on Polish HBO Comedy, on February 27, 2012, as Podmiejski czyściec (Suburban Purgatory). The show began airing in New Zealand on TV2 on February 14, 2012. In the United Kingdom, Suburgatory started airing on Channel 4's digital channel E4 from July 17, 2012. For Germany, ProSiebenSat.1 has picked up the series and will start airing it on Wednesday nights beginning on August 29. It is also shown in Denmark on TV2 Zulu. In Portugal, it was aired Monday to Friday, at 18:30, from November 22, 2012, until December 21, 2012, on RTP2. In Brazil, the show premiered on January 3, 2013, at 3:30 AM in the SBT. In Greece the show premiered on July 15, 2013, on Star Channel airing Monday to Friday at 2:30 PM, airing the first 2 Seasons. In Asia, the show started airing on Star World from January 16, 2014. The show also aired briefly, on Malaysia's, NTV7 in 2013. In France, the show premiered on Canal+ Family on May 3, 2013. The series finale aired on March 23, 2015. The show also aired on HD1 from April 24, 2014.

References

External links

Suburgatory, the book at Amazon.com

2010s American single-camera sitcoms
2010s American teen sitcoms
2011 American television series debuts
2014 American television series endings
American Broadcasting Company original programming
English-language television shows
Television series about bullying
Television series about teenagers
Television shows based on books
Television series by Warner Bros. Television Studios
Television shows set in New York (state)
Television series created by Emily Kapnek